Yin Jian (1904–1937), also known as Dongshan, alias Huang Jianchun, was an early member of the Communist Party of China and a member of the 28 Bolsheviks. He was born in Huilongshan Town, Tuanfeng County, Hubei Province. In 1926, he went to the Soviet Union to study at Moscow Sun Yat-sen University. In January 1931, he was made a Party Committee member for Shanghai and later for Beiping. He was later arrested, imprisoned and sentenced to death, which was later commuted to 14 years in prison. In 1932, while imprisoned, he was replaced in his positions by Bo Yibo. In 1936, through the efforts of Liu Shaoqi, he was among 57 communists who were released from prison. He died of illness the next year.

References

1904 births
1937 deaths
Moscow Sun Yat-sen University alumni
61 Renegades